Solvathellam Unmai is 1987 Indian Tamil-language thriller film directed by Netaji, starring Vijayakanth and Rekha. It was released on 23 January 1987.

Plot 

A newspaper editor Jagan mastheads an inaccurate, unverified story about the death of a doctor Sundaramoorthy. Unable to prevent the print order from reaching the stands, he murders the doctor the same night. This brings him in league with a murderer and impersonator whose designs had tricked him into publishing the story in the first place. It is now left to the son of the editor's victim Vijay to avenge his father's death.

Cast 
 Vijayakanth as Vijay
 Rekha as Rekha
 Jaishankar as Jagan
 Radha Ravi as Fake Dr. Ramanathan
 Poornam Viswanathan as Dr. Sundaramoorthy
 Senthil as Geetha's husband
 Kovai Sarala as Geetha
 Delhi Ganesh as Raghavan
 Kallapetti Singaram as Munusamy
 Charle as Caregiver Psychiatrist
 Gundu Kalyanam as Gundu Kalyanam
 Anuradha as Item number

Soundtrack 
The soundtrack was composed by Thayanban.

Release and reception 
Solvathellam Unmai was released on 23 January 1987. On 6 February 1987, N. Krishnaswamy of The Indian Express said, "Good photography by Ashok Kumar in patches and realistic performances by Jaishankar and Poornam Viswanathan are the strong points of this film. The major flaw is Netaji's narration that lacks both clarity and conviction. There is an intelligent core to the story, only the storytelling is messy." Jayamanmadhan criticised the story, but praised the director for making it entertaining.

References

External links 
 

1980s Tamil-language films
1987 directorial debut films
1987 films
1987 thriller films
Indian thriller films